José do Egito (English: Joseph from Egypt) is a Brazilian miniseries produced and broadcast by RecordTV. It premiered on January 30, 2013 and ended on October 9, 2013. It is based on the biblical account of the book of Genesis that deals with the patriarch Joseph, son of Jacob.

Synopsis 
Joseph was born around 1716 BC, in Haran, region of Mesopotamia, a ‘miracle‘ son. He is the son of Rachel, a sterile woman and the most loved wife of Jacob, who is already an old man when his son is born. Joseph soon becomes the favorite son. Joseph receives an ornamented tunic from Jacob, symbolizing he was chosen as his successor. Unaccepting of their father‘s decision and overcome by envy, the brothers decide to teach Joseph a lesson, throwing him into a deep well with no way out and they then sell the brother as a slave. Joseph is taken to Egypt. The young Hebrew becomes the servant of Potiphar, head of the Pharaoh Apepi‘s guard. Sati, the commander‘s wife, begins to feel a burning desire for Joseph, and does everything to conquer his heart, but always fails. Furious, she gets back at Joseph by lying and saying the Hebrew tried to rape her. Potiphar sends him to prison. Pharaoh Apepi begins to be tormented by strange nightmares and, when he finds out that Joseph has the gift to interpret dreams, he calls him to the royal palace. After hearing Apepi‘s dream, Joseph reveals that Egypt will enjoy seven years of bounty, which will then be replaced by long period of famine. Joseph also says it will be necessary to store enough food during the bounty period to supply the people during the times of lamentation. When hunger arrives in Canaan, Jacob sends his sons in search of food in Egypt, because he learns it is the only place on earth with food. Upon arriving before the respected governor of Egypt, Jacob‘s sons do not recognize him as their brother under the Egyptian clothing. But Joseph recognizes them and he is forced to hide in order to cry, in deep pain, almost twenty years after the betrayal. Now, only Joseph can save the brothers who made him suffer so much in the past.

Cast 
 Ângelo Paes Leme as José
 Maytê Piragibe as Azenate
 Carla Cabral as Bila
 Samara Felippo as Diná
 Mylla Christie as Raquel
 Caio Junqueira as Simeon
 Eduardo Lago as Pentephres
 Sandro Rocha as Seneb
 Iran Malfitano as Hapu
 Babi Xavier as Elisa
 Gustavo Leão as Benjamin
 Vitor Hugo as Judá
 Marcela Barrozo as Diná (young)
 Paulo Nigro as Siquém
 Ricky Tavares as José (young)
 Camila Rodrigues as Tamar
 Guilherme Winter as Rúben
 Andréa Avancini as Zilpa
 Felipe Cardoso as Levi
 Nanda Ziegler as Naamá
 Thelmo Fernandes as Jetur
 Juliana Boller as Mara
 Bruno Padilha as Kedar
 Henrique Ramiro as Onã
 Rafael Sardão as Nekau
 Caetano O'Maihlan as Gibar
 Joelson Medeiros as Mitri
 Henri Pagnoncelli as Hamor
 Daniel Bouzas as Thot
 João Vitor as Selá
 Elder Gatelly as Ismael
 Janaína Moura as Rebeca
 Bia Braga as Mara (young)
 Fernando Sampaio as Naftali
 Eduardo Spinetti as Dã
 Vasco Valentino as Gade
 Eduardo Melo as Benjamin (young)
 Binho Beltrão as Er
 Edu Porto as Issacar
 Wendell Duarte as Aser
 Acacio Ferreira as Zebulom
 Anna Rita Cerqueira as Azenate (young)
 Eliete Cigarini as Grande Sacerdotisa
 Maurício Ribeiro as Manassés

Production 
Shooting includes scenes recorded in the Atacama Desert in Chile, Egypt and Israel. For the scenery two cities were built representing Avaris, and Hebron.

Rating

References

External links 
  
 

2013 telenovelas
Brazilian telenovelas
RecordTV miniseries
Portuguese-language telenovelas
Television series based on the Bible
2013 Brazilian television series debuts
2013 Brazilian television series endings